Grafton Notch State Park is a public recreation area in Grafton Township, Oxford County, Maine. The state park occupies  surrounding Grafton Notch, the mountain pass between Old Speck Mountain and Baldpate Mountain. The park is abutted by the eastern and western sections of the Mahoosuc Public Reserved Land, which total . The park is managed by the Department of Agriculture, Conservation and Forestry.

History
The addition of 18 more parcels, many less than 5 acres, took place in the 1960s, mostly in 1964. The park boundaries were fixed with the addition on two one-acre parcels in 1977.

Wildlife
Songbirds, migratory birds and occasionally raptors (specifically eagles, falcons, and hawks) are spotted in this park by birdwatchers. Mammalian species such as black bear,  moose, fox, bobcat, coyote, fisher, and white-tailed deer roam on the hiking trails.

Geology
Grafton Notch reflects the glaciation processes carved by the Laurentide Ice sheet during the Wisconsin Glaciation episode. Notable geomorphology of the park includes U-shaped valleys, gorges, and esker. Erosional processes expose the unique bedrock composed of Devonian granite with pegmatite intrusions.  Poorly sorted diamicton and stratified gravel pits indicate glacial and glacio-fluvial depositional processes at work. Additionally, these processes scattered erratics over the u-shaped valley floor.

Noteworthy gorges in Grafton Notch include Screw Auger Falls, Mother Walker Falls and Moose Cave. Screw Auger Falls is located within a steep gorge along the Bear River; when water levels are low enough, erratics are visible in the stream. Steep cliff faces and flat valley floor seen from Mother Walker Falls are characteristic of glacial erosion. However, responsibility for gorge formation is debated; "they may have formed while the ice sheet retreated north of the region and contributed a large quantity of meltwater, or more likely, they formed while the ice sheet covered the area and the subglacial water was under very high pressure". Whether a particular landform was created by local glacier or continental ice sheet is also still debated. Many pegmatite vein intrusions are visible around the water-eroded bedrock of the gorges.

Activities and amenities
The park's mountain scenery includes the Screw Auger and Mother Walker waterfalls and Moose Cave. Recreational opportunities include fishing, hunting, and picnicking. Hiking trails include a rugged  stretch of the Appalachian Trail. The ice climbing in the area is extensive and offers a variety of climbing for the beginner as well as the advanced.

References

External links

Grafton Notch State Park Department of Agriculture, Conservation and Forestry
Grafton Notch State Park and Mahoosuc Public Reserved Land Map Department of Agriculture, Conservation and Forestry

State parks of Maine
State parks of the Appalachians
Protected areas of Oxford County, Maine
Landforms of Oxford County, Maine
Protected areas established in 1963
1963 establishments in Maine